Pen Varlen (September 29, 1916, Russian Empire; May 26, 1990, Leningrad, USSR) was a Soviet Russian-Korean painter and graphic artist, a member of the Leningrad Union of Artists, lived and worked in Leningrad, regarded as a representative of the Leningrad school of painting, most famous for his portrait paintings.

See also
 Leningrad School of Painting
 List of 20th-century Russian painters
 List of painters of Saint Petersburg Union of Artists
 Saint Petersburg Union of Artists

References

Bibliography 
 Выставка произведений ленинградских художников 1951 года. Каталог. Л., Лениздат, 1951. C.16.
 Выставка произведений ленинградских художников 1950 года. Каталог. М-Л., Искусство, 1951. C.20.
 Весенняя выставка произведений ленинградских художников 1955 года. Каталог. Л., ЛССХ, 1956. C.14-15.
 Осенняя выставка произведений ленинградских художников. 1956 года. Каталог. Л., Ленинградский художник, 1958. C.19.
 Мочалов Л. Выставка без жюри. Новые работы ленинградских живописцев. // Вечерний Ленинград, 1956, 11 декабря.
 1917 — 1957. Выставка произведений ленинградских художников. Каталог. Л., Ленинградский художник, 1958. С.24.
 Осенняя выставка произведений ленинградских художников 1958 года. Каталог. Л., Художник РСФСР, 1959. С.21.
 Выставка произведений ленинградских художников 1960 года. Каталог. Л., Художник РСФСР, 1963. С.15.
 Выставка произведений ленинградских художников 1960 года. Каталог. Л., Художник РСФСР, 1961. С.31.
 Республиканская художественная выставка «Советская Россия». Каталог. М., Советский художник, 1960. С.63.
 Выставка произведений ленинградских художников 1961 года. Каталог. Л., Художник РСФСР, 1964. С.31.
 Осенняя выставка произведений ленинградских художников 1962 года. Каталог. Л., Художник РСФСР, 1962. С.21.
 Ленинград. Зональная выставка 1964 года. Каталог. Л, Художник РСФСР, 1965. C.40.
 Кривенко И. «Ленинград» (раздел живописи) // Художник. 1965, № 3. С.27-36.
 Третья республиканская художественная выставка «Советская Россия». Каталог. М., Министерство культуры РСФСР, 1967. С.43.
 Наш современник. Зональная выставка произведений ленинградских художников 1975 года. Каталог. Л., Художник РСФСР, 1980. C.21.
 Портрет современника. Пятая выставка произведений ленинградских художников 1976 года. Каталог. Л., Художник РСФСР, 1983. C.17.
 Изобразительное искусство Ленинграда. Каталог выставки. Л., Художник РСФСР, 1976. C.26.
 Выставка произведений ленинградских художников, посвящённая 60-летию Великого Октября. Л., Художник РСФСР, 1982. С.19.
 Зональная выставка произведений ленинградских художников 1980 года. Каталог. Л., Художник РСФСР, 1983. C.19-20.
 Левандовский С. Живопись на Ленинградской зональной // Искусство. 1981, № 2. С.63.
 Справочник членов Ленинградской организации Союза художников РСФСР. Л., Художник РСФСР, 1987. C.100.
 Peinture Russe. Catalogue. Paris, Drouot Richelieu, 24 Septembre 1991. P.63.
 Связь времён. 1932—1997. Художники — члены Санкт — Петербургского Союза художников России. Каталог выставки. СПб., ЦВЗ «Манеж», 1997. С.295.
 Иванов С. В. Неизвестный соцреализм. Ленинградская школа. СПб., НП-Принт, 2007. С.366, 387, 391, 395. , .
 Юбилейный Справочник выпускников Санкт-Петербургского академического института живописи, скульптуры и архитектуры имени И. Е. Репина Российской Академии художеств. 1915—2005. СПб., «Первоцвет», 2007. С.58.

1916 births
1990 deaths
20th-century Russian painters
Russian male painters
Soviet painters
Socialist realist artists
Leningrad School artists
Members of the Leningrad Union of Artists
Repin Institute of Arts alumni
Russian portrait painters
20th-century Russian male artists